Theodore Roosevelt High School is a public high school in San Antonio, Texas (United States). The school is part of the North East Independent School District, which serves portions of San Antonio and the City of Windcrest. It first opened for classes in 1966, funded by a 1960 school district bond that also established Churchill High School and the Blossom Athletic Center.

Roosevelt is host to two magnet programs:
 Design and Technology Academy
 Engineering & Technologies Academy

Roosevelt was named a National Blue Ribbon School in 1999-2000.

Design and Technology Academy

The Design and Technology Academy (DATA), located on the campus of the school, has approximately 480 students from grades 9 to 12. It was opened in the fall semester of 1999, with its first graduating class in 2002, and first full-four year graduating class in 2003. DATA is a magnet school which specializes in engineering, architecture, web/graphic design, programming and multimedia.

Athletics
The Roosevelt Rough Riders compete in the following sports:

Baseball
Basketball
Cross Country
Football
Golf
Soccer
Softball
Swimming and Diving
Tennis
Track and Field
Volleyball
Wrestling

Notable alumni 
Scott Coolbaugh (Class of 1984) — Former MLB baseball player and current hitting coach for the Baltimore Orioles.
William H. McRaven (Class of 1973) — Retired Admiral and now Chancellor of the University of Texas System.
Jeff Smisek (Class of 1972) — Former President and CEO of United Airlines.

References

External links
 ETA Homepage
 DATA Homepage
 Roosevelt Theatre Company @ Theodore Roosevelt High School

North East Independent School District high schools
Educational institutions established in 1966
High schools in San Antonio
1966 establishments in Texas